Eric Bowness McKay (26 November 1899 – 20 February 1994) was a Co-operative Commonwealth Federation member of the House of Commons of Canada. He was born in Summerside, Prince Edward Island and became a principal and teacher by career. He was also a school principal at Radville, Saskatchewan from 1925 to 1941.

He was first elected to Parliament at the Weyburn riding in the 1945 general election. After serving his only federal term, and after a change in electoral districts, the 20th Canadian Parliament, he was defeated in the 1949 federal election at Maple Creek riding by Irvin Studer of the Liberal party.

References

External links
 

1899 births
1993 deaths
Canadian schoolteachers
Co-operative Commonwealth Federation MPs
20th-century Canadian politicians
Members of the House of Commons of Canada from Saskatchewan
People from Summerside, Prince Edward Island
People from Radville, Saskatchewan